Jazz Party, also known as Art Ford's Jazz Party, is a TV series featuring jazz musicians on WNTA-TV in New York City, which aired on Thursdays at 9pm ET from May 8, 1958, to December 25, 1958. It was a music-focused continuation of Art Ford's Greenwich Village Party, arguably the last series to appear on the DuMont Television Network, which ceased operations on August 6, 1956, though only broadcast on WABD as that station was becoming WNEW-TV after the sale of the DuMont-owned stations to Metromedia.

The 90-minute shows hosted by Art Ford (1921–2006), were distributed by the NTA Film Network. The shows also aired on Armed Forces Television. All episodes were filmed in a New Jersey studio, except for the final episode, which was recorded on August 11, 1958, in New Orleans, and aired on December 25.

Musicians who appeared on the series included Billie Holiday, Coleman Hawkins, Henry "Red" Allen, Pee Wee Russell, Marty Napoleon, Georgie Auld, Buster Bailey, Vinnie Burke, Roy Eldridge, J. C. Higginbotham, Les Paul, Dick Hyman, Anita O'Day, Connee Boswell, Mae Barnes, Chris Connor, Sylvia Syms, Mary Osborne, Teddy Charles, Harry Sheppard, Maxine Sullivan, Alec Templeton, Abbey Lincoln and many others.

See also
List of programs broadcast by the DuMont Television Network
List of surviving DuMont Television Network broadcasts
1958–59 United States network television schedule

References

External links
Jazz Party at IMDB
Three episodes of Jazz Party at Internet Archive
Jazz Party at YouTube
Classic TV Showbiz entry
List of episodes at RainerJazz (PDF)

1958 American television series debuts
1958 American television series endings
1950s American music television series
Black-and-white American television shows
Jazz television series